Below are the results of the second season of the Asia Pacific Poker Tour.  All currencies are US dollars unless otherwise stated.

Events

APPT Macau 
 Casino: Grand Waldo Hotel & Casino 
 Buy-in: HK$25,000 (US$3,200)
 6-Day Event: Monday, September 1, 2008 to Saturday, September 6, 2008
 Number of buy-ins: 538
 Total Prize Pool: $1,620,897
 Number of Payouts: 56
 Winning Hand:

APPT Seoul 
 Casino: Paradise Walker-Hill Casino 
 Buy-in: ₩3,000,000 ($2,870)
 3-Day Event: Friday, September 26, 2008 to Sunday, September 28, 2008
 Number of buy-ins: 165
 Total Prize Pool: ₩465,300,000 (US$400,622)
 Number of Payouts: 16
 Winning Hand:

APPT Auckland
 Casino: Skycity Casino 
 Buy-in: NZ$2,800 (US$1,860)
 4-Day Event: Friday, October 9, 2008 to Monday, October 12, 2008
 Number of buy-ins: 306
 Total Prize Pool: NZ$856,800 (US$511,060)
 Number of Payouts: 32
 Winning Hand:

APPT Manila
 Casino: Hyatt Hotel & Casino Manila
 Buy-in: ₱100,000 ($2,350)
 4-Day Event: Thursday, November 13, 2008 to Sunday, November 16, 2008
 Number of buy-ins: 285
 Total Prize Pool: ₱26,790,000 ($542,856)
 Number of Payouts: 32
 Winning Hand:

APPT Sydney
 Casino: Star City Casino
 Buy-in: A$6,300 (US$4,725)
 6-Day Event: Tuesday, December 2, 2008 to Sunday, December 7, 2008
 Number of buy-ins: 477
 Total Prize Pool: A$2,800,000 (US$1,867,079)
 Number of Payouts: 48
 Winning Hand:

Notes

External links
Official site

Asia Pacific Poker Tour
2008 in poker